Hoseynabad (also Romanized as Ḩoseynābād) is a village in Margan Rural District, in the Central District of Hirmand County, Sistan and Baluchestan Province, Iran. At the 2006 census, its population was 58, in 10 families.

References 

Populated places in Hirmand County